KDTH (1370 AM) is a radio station based in Dubuque, Iowa.  The station is owned by Radio Dubuque.  KDTH is a "full service" local radio station with a full-time news department, sports director, farm director and staff of local personalities, many of whom have been part of the Dubuque radio scene for more than 30 years.  Its transmitter and towers are located across the Mississippi River from Dubuque in East Dubuque, Illinois just south of the U.S. 20 Bridge. The daytime signal is 5,000 watts non-directional utilizing one tower while the nighttime signal is 5,000 watts directional utilizing all four towers on-site to direct the signal primarily to the north.

The KDTH music format is described as Legendary Performers - Unforgettable Songs and it includes familiar oldies of the 1950s, '60s and '70s blended with recordings by Sinatra, Bennett, Nat King Cole and others plus contemporary talents like Diana Krall, Jane Monheim, Rod Stewart, Carly Simon, Michael Buble and others who record songs from what is now called The Great American Songbook.

The station targets the large 45+ demographic in the tri-state area of Iowa, Wisconsin & Illinois.

History
On Sunday, May 4, 1941 KDTH began broadcasting. The station broadcast with 1000 watts. The transmitter was located in East Dubuque, Illinois, and it featured a three tower array.

The station became established as an important news and information source in the Dubuque area.  People like Bob Gribben, Betty Thomas, Gerald “Red” McAleece, and Gordon Kilgore became familiar names to a large part of the population.

See also
Radio Dubuque

References

External links
KDTH Website
Radio Dubuque Website

DTH
Mass media in Dubuque, Iowa
Radio stations established in 1941
Full service radio stations in the United States
Adult standards radio stations in the United States